Mountains constitute a significant part of Bulgaria and are dominant in the southwest and central parts. Bulgaria's highest mountains are Rila (highest peak Musala, 2925 m; the highest in the Balkans) and Pirin (highest peak Vihren, 2914 m). The large mountain chain of Stara planina (Balkan Mountains) runs west–east across the entire country, bisecting it and giving the name to the entire Balkan peninsula. Other extensive mountains are the massifs Rhodopes and Strandzha in the south.

List of mountains in Bulgaria with their highest peaks

List of peaks above 2500 m

Gallery

See also
 List of mountain peaks in Pirin
 Rila
 Balkan Mountains
 Rhodope Mountains
 List of mountains of the Balkans
 List of European ultra-prominent peaks
 List of the highest European ultra-prominent peaks
 List of mountain ranges
 Most isolated major summits of Europe
 Southernmost glacial mass in Europe

External links

Водач за българските планини 

Bulgaria
Mountains
Bul